Heterospathe elegans is a species of flowering plants in the palm family (Arecaceae). It is found in New Guinea.

References

External links 
 Heterospathe elegans at The Plant List
 Heterospathe elegans at Tropicos

Areceae
Flora of New Guinea
Plants described in 1907